Zunino is an Italian surname from the region of Liguria in northern Italy        ...Urbe  the village name where all Zunino surname started near the city of Genoa.  Notable people with the surname include:

João Nílson Zunino (born 1946), or Zunino, Brazilian football club executive
Marco Zunino (born 1976), Peruvian film, television and stage actor and singer-songwriter
Michel Zunino (1889–1958), French Communist politician and resistance member
Mike Zunino (born 1991), American baseball player
Ricardo Zunino (born 1949), Argentine racing driver

Italian-language surnames